Tip en Tap is a Belgian animated television series created by Ray Goossens and produced by the Belgische Radio en Televisie (BRT) in 1969. There were 26 episodes.

The series featured two puppies who used to get into some kind of mischief in each episode, but who were always saved by their uncle (a flying adult dog) at the last second. At the end, their uncle would bring them back home to their beds and tuck them in under the sheets.

This cartoon was also very popular in Czechoslovakia, broadcast as a bedtime story (Večerníček) at 7:00 PM on ČST1. Both Czech and Slovak language versions were made. A Hungarian version also existed and was broadcast as a bedtime story (TV Maci) along with Füles Macko on MTV1. Still very popular in both countries, it was also released on DVD.

References

External links
 

1960s animated television series
1970s animated television series
Belgian children's animated television series
Television duos
1960s Belgian television series
1970s Belgian television series
1969 Belgian television series debuts
1973 Belgian television series endings
Animated television series about dogs